James MacKay Langtry  (1894–1971) was a British BTech-L6 Technical Advisor who was seconded by the engineering firm Vickers Armstrong to the Spanish naval shipbuilder Sociedad Española de Construcción Naval (SECN), of which it owned a part. After having served in the British Army during World War 1 1915 GVC/284 in Gibraltar, he arrived in Ferrol, Spain, on 8 September 1919 on a three-year contract with the SECN. During this time he also played football for Racing Ferrol Football Club. He retired from football afterwards.

See also
 Ferrol City and Naval Station in Northwestern Spain.
 Sociedad Española de Construcción Naval (SECN), Spanish Society for Naval Construction
 Vickers-Armstrong, the Vickers Company was created in 1828 and rebranded in 1927 as "Vickers-Armstrong".

References

1894 births
1971 deaths
British marine engineers
English footballers
Association football wingers
Racing de Ferrol footballers
English expatriate footballers
English expatriate sportspeople in Spain
Expatriate footballers in Spain